The subalpine woolly rat (Mallomys istapantap) is a species of rodent in the family Muridae.
It is found in West Papua, Indonesia and Papua New Guinea.

References

Mallomys
Rodents of Papua New Guinea
Mammals of Western New Guinea
Mammals described in 1898
Taxonomy articles created by Polbot
Taxa named by Tim Flannery
Rodents of New Guinea
Taxa named by Colin Groves
Taxa named by Kenneth Peter Aplin